Pedro Siza Vieira (born 14 July 1964) is a Portuguese lawyer and politician who served as Deputy Prime Minister  and Minister of Economy  in the government of Prime Minister António Costa.

Early life and education
Siza Vieira was born in Lisbon, where is father Antonio Carlos, a chemical engineer from Matosinhos, in the outskirts of Porto, was working at the time at CUF, a large industrial conglomerate. Siza's family returned to the north and lived in Matosinhos and Santo Tirso, where he completed his secondary education. Siza enrolled in the Law School of Coimbra University and completed his law degree from the L aw School of the University of Lisbon.

Career
Siza Vieira joined the government in 2017 from the law firm Linklaters. As a lawyer, he was a partner at Morais Leitão, J. Galvão Teles e Associados and a partner at Linklaters between 2002 and 2017, and as served as the Managing Partner of the firm's Lisbon office between 2006 and 2016.

As minister, Siza Vieira notably launched a 1.3 billion-euro ($1.5 billion) fund in 2021 to strengthen the capital of small and medium-sized companies hard hit by the COVID-19 pandemic in Portugal, mainly in the tourism and retail sectors.

References

1964 births
Living people
Economy ministers of Portugal
Government ministers of Portugal
University of Lisbon alumni